Bertram Fletcher Robinson (22 August 1870 – 21 January 1907) was an English sportsman, journalist, author and Liberal Unionist Party campaigner. Between 1893 and 1907, he wrote nearly three hundred items, including a series of short stories that feature a detective called "Addington Peace". However, Robinson is perhaps best remembered for his literary collaborations with his friends Arthur Conan Doyle and P. G. Wodehouse.

Early life and family
Bertram Fletcher Robinson (affectionately referred to as either 'Bobbles' or 'Bertie') was born on 22 August 1870 at 80 Rose Lane, Mossley Hill, Liverpool. In early 1882, he relocated with his family to Park Hill House at Ipplepen in Devon. His father, Joseph Fletcher Robinson (1827–1903), was the founder of a general merchant business in Liverpool (c. 1867). Around 1850, Joseph travelled to South America and was befriended by Giuseppe Garibaldi. Thereafter, he fought in the Guerra Grande alongside Garibaldi and the Uruguayans against the Argentine dictator, Juan Manuel de Rosas. Robinson's uncle, Sir John Richard Robinson (1828–1903), was the long-time editor-in-chief of the Daily News and a prominent committee member of the Liberal Reform Club.

Bertram Fletcher Robinson was educated at Newton Abbot Proprietary College (1882–1890) and Jesus College, Cambridge (1890–1894). Other notable 'Old Newtonians' include the writer Sir Arthur Quiller-Couch and the explorer Lieutenant Colonel Percy Harrison Fawcett.  Robinson won three Rugby Football Blues between 1891 and 1893 and, according to his obituary in the Daily Express (22 January 1907), he would have played for England but for an "accident".  He also rowed for Jesus College and was a member of the crew that won the Thames Challenge Cup at the Henley Royal Regatta on 7 July 1892. On 12 February 1894, The Times reported that Robinson was tried for the position of fourth oar with the Cambridge 'Trial Eight' ahead of the fifty-first annual Oxford and Cambridge Boat Race.  Jesus College awarded Robinson with a Second Class History Tripos Bachelor of Arts degree (1893), Part I of the Law Tripos Bachelor of Arts degree (1894) and a Master of Arts degree (1897).  Robinson became a barrister in June 1896 but he never practised that profession.

On 3 June 1902, 31‑year‑old Robinson married 22-year-old Gladys Hill Morris at St. Barnabas Church, Kensington, London. Gladys was a self-proclaimed 'actress' and a daughter of the noted Victorian artist Philip Richard Morris (1833–1902). The couple had no children of their own. However, the Robinsons acted as godparents to Geraldine Winn Everett, the daughter of Percy Everett.

Writing and editorial career

Bertram Fletcher Robinson held editorial positions with The Newtonian (1887–1889), The Granta (1893–1895), The Isthmian Library (1897–1901), Daily Express (July 1900 – May 1904), Vanity Fair (May 1904 – October 1906), The World, a journal for Men and Women (October 1906 – January 1907), and the Gentleman's Magazine (January 1907).

Between 1893 and 1907, Robinson wrote or coauthored at least nine satirical playlets (including four with his friend, PG Wodehouse), fifty-four short stories (including seven with his friend, Sir Malcolm Fraser, 1st Baronet), four lyrics, forty-four articles (for fifteen different periodicals), one hundred and twenty-eight newspaper reports, twenty-four poems and eight books. He also edited eight books about various sports and pastimes for The Isthmian Library (1897–1901).

In July 1900, Robinson and the creator of Sherlock Holmes, (Sir) Arthur Conan Doyle, 'cemented' their friendship while aboard a passenger ship that was travelling to Southampton from Cape Town. The following year, Robinson told Doyle legends of ghostly hounds, recounted the supernatural tale of Squire Richard Cabell III and showed him around grimly atmospheric Dartmoor. The pair had previously agreed to co-author a Devon-based story but in the end, their collaboration led only to Doyle's celebrated novel, The Hound of the Baskervilles. Robinson also contributed an idea to the plot of a Sherlock Holmes short-story entitled "The Adventure of the Norwood Builder", which was first published in Collier's Weekly on 31 October 1903.

Doyle is sometimes seen as downplaying the importance of Robinson's contribution to The Hound of the Baskervilles. The literary scholar and critic, Professor William Wallace Robson wrote that it is 'impossible to determine' the precise extent of Robinson's role, but in all probability he merely acted as a 'creative trigger'. He adds that once the element of Sherlock Holmes was added to the original idea, the novel evolved beyond the joint project that was originally posited. Robinson himself conceded that his part in the collaboration was restricted to that of an 'assistant plot producer'.

Death

Bertram Fletcher Robinson died aged 36 years on 21 January 1907, at 44 Eaton Terrace, Belgravia, London. The official cause of his death is recorded as 'enteric fever (3 weeks) and peritonitis (24 hours)'. Others with a bent for the occult attributed his death to a curse linked with an Egyptian artefact called the Unlucky Mummy. Robinson was buried beside his parents at St. Andrew's Church, Ipplepen, near Newton Abbot in Devon.

Obituaries were published in The World, The Times, Daily Express, The Western Guardian, The Western Morning News, The Sphere, The Athenaeum, The Illustrated London News, The Mid-Devon and Newton Times, Vanity Fair, The Book of Blues and the Annual Report of the Jesus College Cambridge Society (1907). The English poet and journalist, Jessie Pope also wrote the following eulogy to Robinson, which was published in the Daily Express newspaper on Saturday 26 January 1907:

Memorial service

At 4pm on Thursday 24 January 1907, The Reverend Septimus Pennington conducted a memorial service for Robinson at St. Clement Danes, Strand, London. According to a report in the Daily Express newspaper (Saturday 26 January 1907), the congregation included the following notable figures: Arthur Hammond Marshall, Owen Seaman, Max Pemberton, Cyril Arthur Pearson, Percy Everett, Alfred Harmsworth, Joseph Lawrence, Sir Felix Semon (Physician to the King), Sir William Bell (former member of the British Iron Trade Association & tax-reform campaigner), Anthony Hope, Clement King Shorter, Gerald Fitzgerald Campbell (Author), Leslie Ward ('Spy'), Thomas Anstey Guthrie, Evelyn Wrench and Henry Hamilton Fyfe.

The congregation sang a hymn entitled Peace, Perfect Peace, which was written by Edward Henry Bickersteth in 1875. Sir Arthur Conan Doyle was unable to attend either the funeral or the memorial service because he was at that time, busily campaigning for the release from prison of one George Edalji. He did however send a floral tribute to the funeral service in Ipplepen with a message that read "In loving memory of an old and valued friend from Arthur Conan Doyle".

Legacy
In 1908, the British author Max Pemberton had a story entitled Wheels of Anarchy published by Cassell & Company (London). This story is based upon notes that were written by Robinson shortly before his death. It is an adventure tale about anarchists and assassins that is set across Europe. The novel's hero, Bruce Driscoll, is a recent graduate of Jesus College, Cambridge and he appears to be modelled upon Robinson. Wheels of Anarchy by Max Pemberton was republished in facsimile form in December 2010.

In 1909, Gladys Robinson sold both Park Hill House and 44 Eaton Terrace and she then appears to have moved to continental Europe. During World War I, Gladys met Major William John Frederick Halliday (Distinguished Service Order), a Royal Artillery officer born in London in 1882 and affectionately referred to as "Fred". The couple got married at the British Diplomatic mission in Paris on 7 January 1918 and thereafter, they relocated to Henley-on-Thames in Oxfordshire.

In October 1912, Conan Doyle's novel The Lost World was published. This story is narrated by a character named Edward E. Malone. It is possible that Malone is also partially modelled upon Robinson. Like Robinson, Malone was raised in the West Country, became an accomplished rugby union player, worked as a London-based journalist and loved a woman called Gladys.

In 1951, Robinson's book entitled The Chronicles of Addington Peace (London: Harper & Brother, 1905) was listed in the influential Queen's Quorum: A History of the Detective-Crime Short Story as Revealed by the 106 Most Important Books Published in this Field Since 1845.

In January 2009, Ipplepen Parish Council gave permission for a commemorative bench and plaque to be situated outside Caunters Close in Ipplepen. The inscription on the plaque reads as follows: 'Bertram Fletcher Robinson (1870–1907). Journalist, Editor, Author and former resident of Ipplepen. He assisted Arthur Conan Doyle with The Hound of the Baskervilles'''.

In June 2010, Brian Pugh, Paul Spiring and Sadru Bhanji had a book published that is entitled Arthur Conan Doyle, Sherlock Holmes and Devon. This book contends that the success of Sherlock Holmes is partly attributable to Bertram Fletcher Robinson and two other former Devon residents called George Turnavine Budd and George Newnes (Doyle's original publisher).

On 1 September 2011, Short Books Ltd. released a novel entitled The Baskerville Legacy by John O'Connell. The book presents a highly fictionalised account of the circumstances that led Arthur Conan Doyle and Bertram Fletcher Robinson to conceive The Hound of the Baskervilles''.

References

External links
 
 
 
 
 Bertram Fletcher Robinson tribute website
 Bertram Fletcher Robinson Chronology

1870 births
1907 deaths
Alumni of Jesus College, Cambridge
Cambridge University R.U.F.C. players
English barristers
English male journalists
English newspaper editors
English book editors
English humorists
English male poets
English songwriters
Liberal Unionist Party politicians
People from Teignbridge (district)
Writers from Liverpool
Vanity Fair (British magazine) people
Daily Express people
Musicians from Devon
19th-century English musicians
19th-century English lawyers